Greve, Buhrlage, and Company may refer to:

Greve, Buhrlage, and Company (Lytle Street, Louisville, Kentucky), at 1501 Lytle St.; listed on the National Register of Historic Places in Portland, Louisville, Kentucky
Greve, Buhrlage, and Company (15th Street, Louisville, Kentucky), at 312-316 N. 15th St.; listed on the National Register of Historic Places in Portland, Louisville, Kentucky